Career Pathways is a workforce development strategy used in the United States to support workers’ transitions from education into and through the workforce.  This strategy has been adopted at the federal, state and local levels in order to increase education, training and learning opportunities for America’s current and emerging workforce.

Career pathways are an integrated collection of programs and services intended to develop students’ core academic, technical and employability skills; provide them with continuous education, training; and place them in high-demand, high-opportunity jobs.

A career pathways initiative consists of a partnership among community colleges, primary and secondary schools, workforce and economic development agencies, employers, labor groups and social service providers, see The Evolution and Potential of Career Pathways  U.S. Department of Education, Office of Career, Technical, and Adult Education (OCTAE), April 2015).

Community colleges coordinate occupational training, remediation, academic credentialing, and transfer preparation for career pathways initiatives.

Career pathways models have been adopted at the federal, state and local levels. Given their cross-system nature, states often combine multiple federal streams to fund different elements of career pathways models.

The US Department of Labor’s Employment and Training Administration had advocated for career pathways to fill the need for more highly trained and skilled workers.

The US Department of Education’s Office of Vocational and Adult Education has also supported career pathways initiatives to provide students with postsecondary education and training to improve their skills to advance in the workplace.  and recently selected five sites as recipients of grants to strengthen their career pathways efforts.

Career Pathways are often referred to as Campus Recruitment Training (CRT) in other Countries like the United Kingdom, China and India. This training program is taken up by Undergraduate colleges to train their students in facing placements through campuses. The program typically imparts training about interviews, group discussion rounds, aptitude and verbal test rounds.

ACTE
In addition, the Association for Career and Technical Education (ACTE), the nation’s largest not-for-profit education association dedicated to the advancement of education that prepares youth and adults for successful careers, representing approximately 30,000 educators, administrators and others involved in CTE, supports career pathways and Career Clusters. ACTE has resources on career pathways in its online Research Clearinghouse.

NCCER

Another organization dedicated to workforce development and construction education is NCCER (National Center for Construction Education and Research). NCCER is a not-for-profit 501(c)(3) education foundation created in 1996 to develop standardized construction, maintenance, and pipeline curricula with portable credentials and help address the critical skilled workforce shortage. NCCER's training process of accreditation, instructor certification, standardized curriculum, national registry, assessment, and certification is a key component in the construction industry's workforce development efforts. NCCER is headquartered in Alachua, Fla., and is affiliated with the University of Florida's M.E. Rinker, Sr., School of Building Construction.

Career Pathways initiative
Career Pathways has spread quickly throughout states and cities as students and adults have benefited from their use and as communities have begun to see the rewards of the pathways.       In the Midwest, the Joyce Foundation's Shifting Gears Initiative is working to implement career pathways programs in Illinois, Indiana, Michigan, Minnesota, Ohio, and Wisconsin.   Other states including Arkansas,
California,
Kentucky, Oregon 
and Washington  have statewide career pathways initiatives in place. Cities like New York, Madison, St. Louis, and San Diego have also begun to develop career pathway initiatives for their specific needs. More information on states’ approaches to career pathways is available in ACTE’s State CTE Profiles.

A national Public Service Announcement (PSA) titled "Grads of Life" funded by the Rockefeller Foundation, the Annie E. Casey Foundation, and the W.K. Kellogg Foundation launched in September 2014 to support career pathway initiatives. The campaign presents messages and images to persuade employers that candidates without college degrees but who are graduates of pathway programs can be valued employees.

The state of Oregon defines career pathways as a “series of articulated educational and training programs and services that enables students, often while they are working, to advance over time to successively higher levels of education and employment in a given industry or occupational sector. Each step on a career pathway is designed explicitly to prepare students to progress to the next level of employment and education.[1]”  More than 250 career pathway roadmaps are available through Oregon's 17 Community Colleges.

Career pathways initiatives are also in place on the local level, including programs at Madison Area Technical College, Portland Community College, James A. Rhodes State College, Santa Fe College, and South Seattle Community College (Auto , Business Info Tech , Welding , & Hospitality ).

Career Pathways is supported by the White House National Economic Council, the Office of Management and Budget, the U. S. Departments of Agriculture, Commerce, Defense, Education,
Energy, Health and Human Services, Housing and Urban Development, Interior, Justice, Labor, the Social Security Administration, Transportation, and Veterans Affairs

See also 
Workforce Strategy Center
 Center for Law and Social Policy

Notes

External links 
The Evolution and Potential of Career Pathways   U.S. Department of Education, Office of Career, Technical, and Adult Education (OCTAE), (2015, April). 
Background and Structure of Career Clusters and Pathways
Reeves, Diane Lindsey CAREER ACADEMY TOOLKIT.  Raleigh, North Carolina: Bright Futures Press, 2006.  .
Shifting Gears: Skills for Worker Enhancement & Economic Growth. The Joyce Foundation.
Reengineer Education and Skill Development Systems. Center for Law and Social Policy.
How to Build a Stronger Workforce, Benefits for Business of Employment Pathways: 

Career advice services